Danijel Cesarec (born 8 January 1983) is a retired Croatian footballer.

Club career

NK Marsonia

Cesarec started his career in NK Marsonia. He played there 2 years (2000-2002), making 40 appearances and scoring 6 league goals. This good season was a result of a big interest from foreign clubs.

Sparta Prague

In 2002, Daniel joined Czech major club AC Sparta Prague. In Prague he made only 3 league appearances, and his dream never became true. Then, Sparta sent him loan at 1. FK Příbram. There, he made 23 league appearances, scoring 3 goals. After Příbram, Sparta Prague sent him (again) on loan at Akratitos F.C. In Akratitos, he had a fine season, with 24 performances and 10 goals.

Greece

Egaleo

Cesarec spent 2005–2007 years in Egaleo F.C. He had full seasons in Egaleo, with a total of 40 appearances and only 5 goals. However, many Greek teams are interested to sign Cesarec.
 
Asteras Trpolis

Cesarec had his best time of his career in Tripoli, Greece. He joined Asteras Tripoli F.C. in 2007 summer. He stayed there for 3 years with fine seasons. His statistics with blue-yellow jersey are 72 performances and 26 goals. He was expert for heading and penalty-taking. He is the club's top goalscorer ever in Greek Superleague. He was one of the most successful forwards these years.

Aris

His fine seasons with Asteras prized with a signing with a club with many success in Greece and Europe. This club, is Aris Thessaloniki F.C. But Cesarec hadn't his best season, because he was struck with a lot of injuries. He made about 30 appearances with Aris and scored only 5 goals (3 of them were on Europa League, and Aris made his best season in Europe this season). In 2011-2012 season, he has made 2 league appearances. On late November he scored against Panionios. The next matchday he scored also in the home victory against Panathinaikos FC.

Career statistics

Club

External links
 Danijel Cesares at the Croatian Football Federation website

1983 births
Living people
Sportspeople from Slavonski Brod
Association football forwards
Croatian footballers
Croatia under-21 international footballers
NK Marsonia players
AC Sparta Prague players
1. FK Příbram players
A.P.O. Akratitos Ano Liosia players
Egaleo F.C. players
Asteras Tripolis F.C. players
Aris Thessaloniki F.C. players
Maccabi Haifa F.C. players
HNK Rijeka players
NK Osijek players
NK Slaven Belupo players
Croatian Football League players
Czech First League players
Super League Greece players
Israeli Premier League players
Croatian expatriate footballers
Expatriate footballers in the Czech Republic
Croatian expatriate sportspeople in the Czech Republic
Expatriate footballers in Greece
Croatian expatriate sportspeople in Greece
Expatriate footballers in Israel
Croatian expatriate sportspeople in Israel